El Pilar de la Mola is a village in Formentera, Balearic Islands, Spain.  It lies on the La Mola peninsula, the highest point on the island, and has a good view of Formentera.

Populated places in Formentera